Samiya Mumtaz (born 1970, Karachi), is a Pakistani film and television actress. She has performed in several TV dramas.

Family
Mumtaz was born to Khawar and Kamil Khan Mumtaz. Her mother is a prominent women's rights activist, while her father is an architect. She has two brothers, and two children.

Career 
She first appeared a show in Shahid Nadeem's directed drama serial Zard Dopehar aired on PTV in 1995. She is also notable for her performance in drama serials such as Meri Zaat Zara-e-Benishan, Yariyan. She also started off as a theater personality and then moved to television. Mumtaz has worked in drama serials  such as Maaye Ni, Sadqay Tumhare, Ali Ki Ammi and Udaari.

Mumtaz made her film debut in 2014 in a drama thriller film Dukhtar, written and directed by Afia Nathaniel. She also starred in a family drama film Moor directed by Jami, released in 2015. Sajal Aly and Samiya are likely to be collaborating for the upcoming project based on Fatima Jinnah

Filmography

Films

Television

Web series

Awards and nominations

References

External links 
 
 Interview: Samiya Mumtaz

Pakistani television actresses
Living people
Best Actor in a Negative Role Hum Award winners
Pakistani female models
1970 births
Actresses from Karachi
20th-century Pakistani actresses
21st-century Pakistani actresses
Pakistani film actresses
Actresses in Urdu cinema
Actresses in Pashto cinema